The Braamse Molen or Koenders Möl is a tower mill in Braamt, Gelderland, Netherlands which was built in 1856. One of only two mills in the Netherlands fitted with Beckers sails, the mill is listed as a Rijksmonument.

History
The Braamse Molen was built in 1856 by the millwrights the Gerritsen Brothers, of Keyenborg for J W Kelderman. In 1872, it was sold to W Koenders, remaining in the ownership of the Koenders family as of 2014. The mill was restored in 1964. It was then that the two Beckers sails) were fitted and the Van Bussel system was fitted to the leading edges of all four sails. The mill was worked regularly until 1990. The Braamse Molen and Bernadette, Nieuw-Wehl are the only two mills in the Netherlands fitted with Beckers sails. It is listed as a Rijksmonument, № 9263.

Description

The Braamse Molen is what the Dutch call a "Grondzeiler". It is a three storey tower mill. There is no stage, the sails reaching almost down to ground level. The cap is covered in dakleer. Winding is by tailpole and winch. The sails are a pair of Common sails, fitted with the Van Bussel system on their leading edges, and a pair Becker sails fitted with the  Van Bussel system on their leading edges. They are carried on a cast iron windshaft, which was cast by F J Penn & Compagnie, Dordrecht, South Holland in 1864. The windshaft also carries the brake wheel, which has 53 cogs. This drives a wallower with 27 teeth, which is situated at the top of the upright shaft. At the bottom of the upright shaft is the great spur wheel, which has 78 cogs. This drives a pair of  diameter French Burr millstones via a lantern pinion stone nut with 25 staves.

References

Windmills in Gelderland
Windmills completed in 1856
Tower mills in the Netherlands
Grinding mills in the Netherlands
Agricultural buildings in the Netherlands
Rijksmonuments in Gelderland